Vehicle turntable can refer to

Car turntable
Turntable (rail)